HNoMS Oslo (pennant number F300) was an  of the Royal Norwegian Navy. The frigate was launched on 17 January 1964, and commissioned on 29 January 1968. Oslo ran aground near Marstein Island on 24 January 1994. One officer was killed in the incident. The next day, on 25 January, she was taken under tow. However as the situation deteriorated, the tow was let go and the frigate sank.

Design and description
The Oslo class was based on the American s with modifications for northern sea conditions, including more freeboard forward. Oslo was initially armed with four /50 calibre guns mounted in twin turrets.

After a refit in the late 1970s  Oslo mounted the two twin 3-inch mounts, six Penguin surface-to-surface missiles, one Mk 29 octuple launcher for Sea Sparrow surface-to-air missiles, carrying 24 missiles in total, and six Mk 32  torpedo tubes in two triple mounts. The ship received her Mk 91 radar director for the Sea Sparrow missiles, and was fitted with DRBU 22, TM 1226 and HSA M 22 radars and SQS-36 sonar. In the late 1980s, Oslo underwent another modernisation. This time the aft twin 3-inch mount was removed to make space for the Teme III rocket-launched depth charges and 40 mm/70 calibre gun and Terne III and TSM 2633 hull and variable depth sonar and replacing the SQS-36. The frigate had a complement of 150 officers and ratings.

Service history
The frigate was one of five authorised as part of the 1960 naval construction programme. Half the cost of the construction of the ship was borne by the United States. The ship was constructed by the Navy Main Yard, Karljohansvern in Horten, Norway, with the keel laid down in 1963. Named for the capital of Norway, the frigate was launched on 17 January 1964 as the lead ship of her class. Oslo was commissioned into the Royal Norwegian Navy on 25 January 1966.

Sinking
On 24 January 1994, Oslo ran aground near the Marstein Lighthouse. The frigate had suffered a boiler feed pump failure and drifted in heavy seas before running aground. On 25 January, the tugboat Lars began to tow the frigate. However, as the frigate's situation deteriorated and it was believed that Oslo would not make port, Lars released the tow and the frigate sank.

Notes

Citations

Sources
 
 
 

1964 ships
Ships built in Horten
Oslo-class frigates
Cold War frigates of Norway